Kwahu refers to an area and group of people that live in Ghana and are part of the Twi-speaking Akan group. The area has been dubbed Asaase Aban, or the Natural Fortress, in view of its position as the highest habitable elevation in the country. Kwahu lies in the Eastern Region of Ghana, on the west shore of Lake Volta. The Kwahus share the Eastern Region with their fellow Akans: the Akyem and Akuapem, as well as the Adangbe-Krobos. A significant migrant population from the Northern and Volta Regions and some indigenous Guans from the bordering Oti and Brong East Regions live in the Afram Plains area. They work as traders, farm-hands, fisherfolk, and caretakers in the fertile waterfront 'melting pot'.
Regions of Ghana

History 

The name Kwahu, according to historians, derives from its myths of origin, "The slave (akoa) died (wu)," which was based on an ancient prophecy that a slave would die so the wandering tribe of Akan would know where to settle. This resonates with the etymology of the Ba-wu-le (Baoulé) Akans of the Ivory Coast whose Warrior Queen Awura Poku had to sacrifice her baby in order to cross the Komoe river. The myth was part of the historical stories of the Agona matriclan, the first paramount lineage of Kwawu, and was later adopted by the Bretuao-Tena matriclan (Twidan) who later replaced them. Other historians trace the name Kwahu to the dangers associated with making the mountainous terrain a habitat as it became known as a destination of no return: go at your own peril or "ko wu" in the Twi language. This latter version is thought to have come either from their ancestral people in Mampong who did not support fragmentation or from enemies who perished in trying to take fighting to the Kwahu in the treacherous mountains.

The Anii or Basila tribe formerly known as Oji, claims that the word Kwahu has nothing to do with the slave myths of the Akans. It was a group of Anii who migrated from Mampong to Kwahu during the civil war between Akans and Atarua Apinaman Kotoko Kingdom. After arriving in Kwahu, they fortified their new settlement by allowing some guards to stay alert within the mountain passes, and in case they see any intruders, they should blow their horn to alert the Anii and Guan settlers. When one of the guards saw a strange movement in the bush he came to inform the leader about it and they told him in the indigenous language of the Anii "Kwahu-Kaw-hu, or Kua-hu" meaning "go back and blow". And the guards replied after blowing the horn saying, Nkawhu, meaning "I went back and blew". Thus,  Kwahu means go back and blow, and not slave theory; they claim that it has nothing to do with the slave theory.

The paramount king of Kwawu resides at Abene, north of Abetifi towards the Volta. The strategic location of Abene, along with a dreaded militia that guarded the route (led by Akwamu warriors) helped stave off attempts by colonial forces to capture the Omanhene. Till this day, the road from Abetifi to the small enclave housing the king is plied with some unease, given the stories recounted.

Before their leaders seized the opportunities presented with the signing of the Bond of 1844, Kwahu was thus an integral part of the Asante Kingdom, attested by available maps of the period. Asante would wage punitive and protracted wars against fellow Akans including Denkyira, Akwamu, Akyem, Fante, Assin, but never fought Kwahu.
Abetifi (Tena matriclan) is the head of the Adonten (vanguard).
Obo (Aduana, Ada, Amoakade) is the head of the Nifa (Right Division)
Aduamoa (Dwumena, Asona) is the head of the Benkum (Left Division).
Pepease is the head of the Kyidom or rear-guard division.

As part of the Asante Empire, Kwawu had an Asante emissary, governor or ambassador at Atibie, next to Mpraeso, of the Ekuona matriclan). To indicate its independence from Asante in 1888 the Kwawu assassinated the Asante emissary in Atibie, about the time of the arrival of the Basel missionaries from Switzerland. Fritz Ramseyer had been granted a few days of rest during a stop at Kwahu while en route to Kumasi with his captors. He recovered quickly from a bout of fever while in the mountains. Upon gaining his freedom later from the Asantehene, he sought permission to build a Christian Mission in Abetifi, thereby placing the town on the world map and opening the area to vocational and evangelical opportunities. Although it remains a small town, Abetifi still draws the reputation of a Center of Excellence in Education with various institutions from the ground up. A Bernese country house built by Ramseyer, typical of the Swiss "Oberland" is well-kept and remains a symbol of early Christian Missionary Zeal. Obo, traditionally pro-Ashanti, led the opposition against⁶ the Swiss.

Until recently, Kwahus shunned political activism and are under-represented in government appointments, in comparison to other Akan groups such as the Ashanti, Fanti, Brong or Akyem.

Eulogy
The "h" spelling is the official spelling from the African Studies Centre, University of Ghana and resembles the pronunciation. The "h" was put in by Swiss missionaries from Basel, who added the "h" to ensure that Kwa, the first syllable, was not pronounced as "eh." The "h" is not separately pronounced in the name. For Anglo-Germanic speakers, Ku-A-U may be an easier pronunciation help whilst Franco-Roman natives would say KoU-AoU with ease.

Educational institutions 

Kwahu has several educational institutions across all the towns and villages. The Presbyterian Church has a university and teachers training college in the town of Abetifi. There are also two nursing training institutions at Nkawkaw, owned and managed by the Catholic Church and a government nursing school at Atibie.

Below are some of the many secondary schools in Kwahu.

1. Presbyterian University College, Ghana

. [Nkawkaw Senior High School, Kawsec located at Nkawkaw.

St Peter's Senior High School
Kwahu Tafo Senior High School
Atibie Nursing and Midwifery training college
Kwahu Ridge. Senior High Technical
Mpraeso Senior High School
St. Paul's Senior High School, Asakraka
Kwahu Tafo Senior High School
Bepong Senior High School
Nkwatia Presbyterian Senior High School
St. Dominic's Senior High School
Abetifi Secondary Technical School
Abetifi Presbyterian Senior High School
St. Joseph Technical School
Amankwakrom Fisheries Agricultural Technical Institute, Afram Plains
Donkorkrom Agricultural Senior High
Mem-Chemfre Community Senior High School
St. Mary's Vocational and Technical Institute, Afram Plains
Maame Krobo Community. Day School,
St. Fidelis Senior High and Technical School
Fodoa Community Senior High School

Economy 

The Kwahu, an Akan people living on the eastern border of Ashanti in Ghana, are well known for their business activities. An enquiry into the reasons for their predominance among the largest shopkeepers by turnover in Accra traced the history of Kwahu business activities back to the British-Ashanti War of 1874, when the Kwahu broke away from the Ashanti Confederacy, focusing on the rubber trade, which continued until 1914. Rubber was carried to the coast for sale, and fish, salt, and imported commodities, notably cloth, were sold on the return journey north. Other Kwahu activities at this time included trading in local products and African beads.

The development of cocoa in south-eastern Ghana provided opportunities for enterprising Kwahu traders to sell there the imported goods obtained at the coast. Previously itinerant traders, the Kwahu began to settle for short periods in market towns. In the 1920s, the construction of the railway from Accra to Kumasi, growing road transportation, and the establishment inland of branches of the European firms reduced the price differences which had made trading inland so profitable. In the 1930s the spread of the cocoa disease, swollen shoot, in the hitherto prosperous south-east, finally turned Kwahu traders' attention to Accra. Trading remained the most prestigious of Kwahu activities, and young men sought by whatever means they could to save the necessary capital to establish a shop.

But Kwahu traders very rarely developed beyond one-man businesses. Profits were siphoned off into buildings and farms which would provide security for times of sickness and old age. (In this respect, the Kwahu are typical of Ghanaian entrepreneurs, with some exceptions.) The misguided perception that petty businesses do not build a stronger capital base required for bigger investment has been proven wrong. Recent developments indicate that this enterprising group of people can provide the new entrepreneurial organization or capital needed for sophisticated setups in a developing country. Within the last few decades, Kwahus have advanced their portfolios and ventured into the acquisition  of bigger assets in the manufacturing, hotel industries and command an enviable leadership position in the building materials and pharmaceutical sectors. Kwahus probably own the most housing and commercial properties together with their Ashanti cousins in Accra and other Metropolitan Cities in the South of the country.

Geography
Access into Kwahu begins from Kwahu jejeti which share boundary with Akyem jejeti (both communities are joint but separated by the Brim river) which is roughly 3 hours drive from the outskirts of Accra and approximately 140.9 km in distance. It lies midway in the road journey from Accra to Kumasi and serves as the gateway to a cluster of smaller towns set within the hills. Although the region doesn't have a lake or identical weather fauna, the mountainous profile resembles the Italian region overlooking Lago di Garda in Lombardy or the surroundings of Interlaken in Switzerland, with winding roads uphill towards Beatenberg. An aerial view of portions of the Allegheny Plateau in the United States provides another good description of Kwahu Country.

Temperatures may trail the normal readings for Accra and other cities of Ghana by up to 3 points at daytime and drop further at night, making the weather in Kwahu relatively cooler and more pleasant. The Afram River collects the major drainage of the Plateau and makes an impressive 100 km journey from Sekyere in Ashanti through Kwahu as a tributary to join the Volta Lake. Canoe fishing by is big business along the vast shoreline and beyond the smaller expanse of water stretch, the fertile grounds of the plains open into a huge agricultural paradise that is unquestionably one of Ghana's bread baskets.

Health 

 Kwahu Government Hospital

Language and culture 
The term Kwahu also refers to the variant of Akan language spoken in this region by approximately 1,000,000 native speakers. Except for a few variations in stress, pronunciation, and syntax, there are no markers in the dialect of Akan spoken by the Kwahu versus their Ashanti or Akyem neighbors. Choice of words and names are pronounced closer to Akuapem Twi as in 1-Mukaase (Kitchen), 2-Afua (a girl's given day name for Friday), 3-Mankani (Cocoyam), etc. but not with the Akuapem tonation or accent. These three examples can quickly indicate the speaker's origin or source influence: Ashanti speakers would say Gyaade, Afia and Menkei for 1-3 above.

Originally of Ashanti stock, oral history details the two-phased migration of the Kwahu from the Sekyere-Efidwase-Mampong ancestral lands through Asante-Akyem Hwidiem to arrive at Ankaase, which is today near the traditional capital of Abene, before spreading out on other settlements with clan members from peripheral Akyem and various parts of the Ashanti heartland. The group that first settled at Abene was led by (M)Ampong Agyei, who is accepted as the Founder of Kwahu. Historical material supports this view that connects the Kwahu to kinsmen who built their capital at Oda.

The fallout with Frimpong Manso, Chief of Akyem (Oda) triggered a second wave of migration, believed to have resulted from the refusal of Kwahu to swear an oath of allegiance, making them de facto subjects, upon arrival at Hwidiem. Unsuccessful incursions by the Oda Chief Atefa into Kwahu territory on the plateau would subsequently earn him the title "Okofrobour": one who takes the battle to the mountains. The jagged escarpment, however, made Kwahu inaccessible, hence the old humor meme Asaase Aban, signifying a naturally fortified and indestructible Kwahu Country.

If Ashanti Twi is by and large the refined language standard, it is appropriate to view Kwahu Twi as the precious stone from which the jeweler styles a gem. There is a certain purity of pronunciation, call it crude, with little effort to polish sounds: Kwahu speakers would opt for "Kawa" (a ring) and not "Kaa", "Barima" (Man) instead of "Berma" and pronounce "Oforiwaa" not "Foowaa". Another slight difference is the preference for full sentences among the Kwahu: "Wo ho te sen?" (How are you?) in place of the shorter "Ete sen?" in Ashanti; Other examples are Wo b3 ka s3 / As3 (you might say, looks like); Ye firi Ghana / Ye fi Ghana (We are from Ghana) and other minor name or word preferences, pronunciations, sentence length, etc. that usually pass unnoticed.

The Mamponghene, who is next to the Ashantehene in hierarchy, and the Kwahuhene are historical cousins, hence both occupy Silver Stools with the salutation Daasebre. The culture of the people of Kwahu does not differ from the larger Akan Group. Inheritance practice is Jewish i. e. through a Mother's lineage and women hold office, own property and can enter into contract without restrictions. Typical of fellow Akans, Fufu is a must have main meal towards close of day, prepared from Cassava or  another Carbohydrate Tuber called Cocoyam and pounded with Plantains. It is served alongside a semi-thickened sauce referred to as soup  but completely different from a Westerner's imagination.

Tourist attractions 

 Bruku Shrine - Kwahu Tafo
Oku Falls - Bokuruwa
The Gaping Rock- Kotoso
The Highest Habitable Point in Ghana - Abetifi
Oworobong Water Falls - Oworobong
Ramseyer Route - Abetifi
The Padlock Rock - Akwasiho
Nana Adjei Ampong Cave - Abene
The Seat of Paramountcy - Abene.

Festivals

Paragliding Festival 
The Ghana Tourism Authority in an attempt to promote domestic tourism, launched the Kwahu Easter Paragliding Festival at Atibie in Kwahu in 2005. This festival is an annual event which is held during every Easter in the month of April. During the event, seasoned pilots are invited to participate and thousands of people visit Odweano Mountain at Kwahu Atibie.

Akwasidaekese Festival 
This is celebrated annually as the last Akwasidae of the year. The festival provides the community to commune and communicate with their ancestors, take stock of their activities as a people, plan ahead of coming years and thank God for His protection and provision over the years.

Notable people

See also 

 Kwahu Easter

References

External links
Phil Bartle, Ph.D., Studies Among the Akan People of West Africa

Geography of Ghana